Hofmann's sunbird (Cinnyris hofmanni) is a species of bird in the family Nectariniidae. It is endemic to eastern Tanzania.

Taxonomy and systematics

The International Ornithological Congress (IOC) recognizes Hofmann's sunbird as a species. However, the Clements taxonomy treats it as a subspecies of Shelley's sunbird, Cinnyris shelleyi.

Description

The male in breeding plumage has an emerald green head, chest, and upper back; dark brown wings, tail, and belly; and a scarlet breast band. The female is grayish green above; the underparts are yellowish gray with darker streaking especially on the chest. Its wings and tail are dark brown. The non-breeding male's plumage is similar to that of the female but with a red breast band and black belly.

Distribution and habitat

Hofmann's sunbird is a year-round resident of eastern Tanzania.

Behavior and ecology

Hofmann's sunbird's principal foods are nectar, insects, and spiders. It forages for arthropods in trees and reedbeds and nectars in flowering trees and shrubs. Its nest is usually in a bush and is made of leaves, bark, grass, and lichen held together with cobwebs. It has been recorded laying clutches of one or two eggs in February and April.

Status

Hofmann's sunbird is generally uncommon but locally common. The IUCN has not assessed the species.

References

Cinnyris
Birds of East Africa